LGC may refer to:
LGC Ltd, a British company providing analytical services, formed after the privatisation of the Laboratory of the Government Chemist
LaGrange Callaway Airport (IATA code LGC), airport in Georgia, USA
Landmark Graphics Corporation, a subsidiary of Halliburton, US/Dubai-based oilfield services corporation
Learner-generated context, educational term
Letchworth Garden City, commonly known as  Letchworth, town in Hertfordshire, England
The Liberal Gun Club, an American gun owners group composed primarily of people with moderate and left-of-center political views 
Linton Global College, college of Hannam University, South Korea
Local Government Chronicle, British weekly magazine
Local Government Commission (disambiguation), used in several jurisdictions
London Gliding Club, British flying club
Lowcountry Graduate Center, educational consortium based in North Charleston, South Carolina, USA